Aschalew Girma (born 11 September 1991) is an Ethiopian professional footballer.

International career

International goals
Scores and results list Ethiopia's goal tally first.

References

External links 
 

1991 births
Living people
Sportspeople from Oromia Region
Ethiopian footballers
Ethiopia international footballers
Association football forwards